William Franklin Metts (August 13, 1905 – April 1, 1993) was an American football coach.  He was the ninth head football coach at The Apprentice School in Newport News, Virginia and he held that position for four seasons, from 1934 until 1937.  His coaching record at Apprentice was 17–14–4.

References

External links
 

1905 births
1993 deaths
The Apprentice Builders football coaches